Nyctibatrachidae is a small family of frogs found in the Western Ghats of India and in Sri Lanka. Their common name is robust frogs. Recognition of Nyctibatrachidae as a family is fairly recent. These frogs were earlier on placed in the broadly defined family Ranidae, most recently divided in three subfamilies, Lankanectinae, Nyctibatrachinae, and Astrobatrachinae.

Genera
The family contains three genera in their own subfamilies:

 Subfamily Astrobatrachinae
Astrobatrachus Vijayakumar et al., 2019 (Western Ghats of southwestern India – 1 species)
Subfamily Lankanectinae
Lankanectes Dubois and Ohler, 2001 (Sri Lanka – 2 species)
 Subfamily Nyctibatrachinae
Nyctibatrachus Boulenger, 1882 (Western Ghats of southwestern India – 28 species)

Description
Nyctibatrachus are robust-bodied frogs that range in size from small (snout–vent length <20 mm in Nyctibatrachus beddomii) to relatively large (up to 84 mm Nyctibatrachus karnatakaensis). They occur in near streams in hilly evergreen forests. Lankanectes is an aquatic species of slow-moving rivers in marshy areas.

References

 
Amphibian families